A Travel Bug is a registered trademark of Groundspeak, Inc. used to describe a dog tag used in Geocaching.  It is moved from cache to cache, with a unique tracking number allowing its movements to be tracked through their geocaching website. Some tags are fastened to an object, known as a hitchhiker, before they are released into a cache. Travel bugs have also been used as advertising to promote Jeep or to increase diabetes awareness. A free service known as Geokrety is also available but this is not affliated to Groundspeak.

Description

A travel bug is an item which is trackable which looks similar to a dog tag. The tag is stamped with a tracking number and the Geocaching.com website address. A travel bug can be attached to another item by use of the chain on the travel bug if required, examples of such items include teddy bears, toy cars, or golf balls. These attached items are called "hitchhikers".  During the registration of the bug on the website, the owner may create an assign a name and also create a purpose or mission for the bug. These missions can be as simply as "to travel as far as possible" or to travel to a specific cache, location or a certain type of location. On Geocaching.com, each travel bug has an individual page which tracks its movement and calculates the distance travelled.

Travel bugs move from cache to cache by Geocachers picking up the bug and physically moving them. There is no obligation to pick up a bug from a cache as Geocachers can simply "discover" the bug on the website. This is where the cacher finds the travel bug and logs it as remaining in the cache it is already in and does not move it on. Travel bugs have been promoted for their use in education, and also in Scouting.

They can also be used in travel bug racing, where a group of geocachers will release bugs on the same day with the objective to either travel the longest distance or to score points by achieving specific objectives.

Similar to a travel bug, a geocoin is a coin printed with a tracking number, to allow its movement to be logged online. Unlike geocoins, which for the most part have separate icons to reflect the different styles and series of coin, travel bugs are normally represented by a generic travel bug icon (though the attached items can vary, the travel bug dog tags are all nearly identical in appearance). A different travel bug icon is available should someone have a travel bug tattoo with a trackable number.

Promotional Travel Bugs

Each year from 2004 to 2007, Jeep had sponsored a contest, the Jeep 4×4 Geocaching Challenge, featuring a different series of special Jeep travel bugs. The travel bugs are released throughout the United States with no specific mission in mind, but every finder was entered into a drawing for a new Jeep and other prizes.  There is a separate contest for photo entries for each Jeep travel bug series. In 2004, five thousand yellow Jeep Wrangler travel bugs were released, followed by five thousand white Jeep Wrangler Rubicon travel bugs in 2005, six thousand green Jeep Rescue concept vehicle travel bugs in 2006, and eight thousand red Jeep Commander travel bugs in 2007. An advertising campaign promoting the travel bugs with adverts in such magazines as Women's Health. Each year, the Jeep travel bugs have followed a different naming convention. The first series of yellow Jeeps were simply numbered,  and the 2005 white Jeeps were given first names. 2006 Jeeps were named after different peaks in the United States,  and 2007 Jeeps were named after different rivers in the United States.

In late 2006, to promote diabetes awareness and to gather support for a United Nations resolution, the International Diabetes Federation disseminated "Unite for Diabetes" travel bugs to be released by volunteers around the world. Unlike the Jeep travel bugs, each Unite for Diabetes travel bug has a specific mission. Every individual bug is assigned to one of 20,000 target cities around the world (for example, Guben, Germany).  The bug's mission is to travel to, then around, its target city, collecting geocaching logs and photos along the way. Like the Jeep series, the Unite for Diabetes series was tied to a contest. Specially made geocoins were also created for release in 2007.

See also 
 Geokrety – Similar, but free tracking service for various items, providing full service for geocaching sites like Opencaching.us, and partial service for other geocaching sites.
 ToyVoyagers

References 
Specific

General

External links

Geocaching
Internet object tracking
Outdoor locating games

de:Geocaching#Trackables
sv:Geocaching#Travel Bug